Richard Joseph Hill (born March 11, 1980), nicknamed "Dick Mountain", is an American professional baseball pitcher for the Pittsburgh Pirates of Major League Baseball (MLB). He has previously played in MLB for the Chicago Cubs, Baltimore Orioles, Boston Red Sox, Cleveland Indians, Los Angeles Angels of Anaheim, New York Yankees, Oakland Athletics, Los Angeles Dodgers, Minnesota Twins, Tampa Bay Rays and New York Mets. He played college baseball for the Michigan Wolverines. Hill was drafted three times in the Major League Baseball draft (1999, 2001 and 2002) before signing with the Cubs. 

Hill has earned both American League and National League Pitcher of the Month honors. He is the only pitcher in Major League history to have had a perfect game broken up by a 9th-inning fielding error as well as the only pitcher in Major League history to have a no-hitter broken up in extra innings by a walk-off home run. At 43 years old, Hill is currently the oldest active MLB player.

Early life
Hill was born and raised in Milton, Massachusetts, and played for Milton High School's varsity baseball team when he was a freshman. He is one of four to do so in the school's history. He was drafted by the Cincinnati Reds in the 36th round of the 1999 Major League Baseball (MLB) Draft; but opted to play college baseball for the Michigan Wolverines. 

As a freshman, he struggled with a 9.23 earned run average (ERA) in 13 games, but he became a full-time member of the rotation as a sophomore, posting a record of 3–5 with a 3.84 ERA in 15 games, including one complete game shutout. In 2000 and 2001, he played collegiate summer baseball for the Chatham A's of the Cape Cod Baseball League.

He was drafted again in the seventh round of the 2001 MLB Draft by the Anaheim Angels but decided to return to the Wolverines. In his junior season at Michigan in 2002, he was 3–7 with a 3.55 ERA in 15 games, including eight complete games and two shutouts, and striking out 104 while walking only 38.

Hill is a natural right-handed thrower, but was converted to lefty by his brother.

Professional career

Chicago Cubs

2002–2004
Hill was selected in the fourth round of the 2002 Major League Baseball draft by the Chicago Cubs and signed on July 10, 2002. He had been rated as having one of the best curveballs in the draft but mechanical and control issues kept him out of the early rounds. He began his professional career with the Boise Hawks of the Northwest League, where he was 0–2 with an 8.36 ERA in six games. In 2003 with Boise he was 1–6 with a 4.35 ERA in 14 starts and led the Northwest League in strikeouts with 99. He was promoted to the Lansing Lugnuts of the Midwest League, where he was 0–1 with a 2.76 ERA in 15 games (4 starts).

In 2004, he was assigned to the Daytona Cubs of the Florida State League. He was 7–6 with a 4.03 ERA in 28 games (19 starts) and 136 strikeouts. He was also selected by Baseball America as having the best curveball in the Cubs organization.

2005 season
Hill began the 2005 season with the West Tenn Diamond Jaxx of the Southern League. He made 10 starts for them, with a 4–3 record and 3.28 ERA while leading the league in strikeouts with 90. He earned a May promotion to the Triple-A Iowa Cubs of the Pacific Coast League. In 11 games for Iowa, he was 6–1 with a 3.60 ERA and 92 strikeouts. He earned Milb.com distinctions as breakthrough performer of the year.

Hill made his major league debut on June 15, 2005, against the Florida Marlins. He pitched one inning of relief, giving up two runs on three hits, and did not factor into the decision. He struck out Carlos Delgado for his first major league strikeout.

Hill's first start was on July 25, 2005, subbing for the oft-injured Kerry Wood against the San Francisco Giants. Once again he gave up two earned runs, but lasted five innings. The game was memorable due to Hill tripping over third-base on his way to the plate after a Todd Walker drive down the right-field line. With just one out and the Cubs down by one, Walker was forced to stop at first base, and Jerry Hairston Jr. (who was behind Hill) at second. Hill did not score, and returned to third base unhurt. He did not factor into the decision, a Cubs' victory. He finished the season with an 0–2 record in 10 games ( innings) while making four starts. His ERA was 9.13 and he struck out 21 while walking 17.

2006 season

In 2006, he started the season in Triple-A with the Iowa Cubs, but was called up on May 4 for a start against the Arizona Diamondbacks. He gained attention in Chicago later in the month during the cross-town classic with the Chicago White Sox. On May 20, Hill lost to the White Sox 7–0, and was the starter in the game that saw A. J. Pierzynski run over Cubs catcher Michael Barrett at the plate in a huge collision.  Hill was sent back to Triple-A Iowa the next day. He made 15 starts for Iowa and was 7–1 with a 1.98 ERA and 135 strikeouts. He was selected to the mid-season Pacific Coast League all-star game, where he was the top star, and he was later selected as a postseason all-star and a Baseball America Triple-A All-Star.

Hill returned to the majors on July 27 with a start against the St. Louis Cardinals. He lasted only  innings, giving up four runs on six hits – walking three. On August 1, he defeated the Arizona Diamondbacks for his first major league victory, and on August 6, he got his second win and his first win streak. On September 6, Hill fanned a career-high 11 batters in a Cubs victory over the Pittsburgh Pirates.  Hill's first complete game and shutout came versus the Cincinnati Reds in a game in which he fanned 10 and allowed just two hits, on September 16.  Hill's two complete games were the only CG's by the Cubs' pitching staff in the 2006 season, and he was one of the solid contributors in the rotation after being called back up, posting a 6–3 record with a 2.93 ERA.

2007 season
Hill joined the starting rotation of the Cubs after spring training, and was the #4 starter in the rotation behind Carlos Zambrano, Ted Lilly, and Jason Marquis. He pitched against the Milwaukee Brewers for his first start of the 2007 season, throwing a perfect game through the first five innings, and finishing with allowing just one hit, and one run over 7 innings pitched. He continued to excel during April, leading some to speculate that he was taking over as the ace in the Cubs rotation while he assembled a streak of 18 consecutive innings without an earned run.

Cubs catcher Michael Barrett described Hill's signature pitch as follows.

Hill suffered a setback in Philadelphia, where he took his second loss of the season, giving up five runs, and leaving the game before getting any outs in the sixth inning. His next start came in New York City, and produced similar results, which resulted in his third loss. Cubs' manager Lou Piniella pointed to control problems. The troubles continued in San Diego during his next start, where he picked up his third consecutive loss 5–1 to the Padres and gave up four home runs. Piniella extended his analysis of Hill's throwing:  "Not the same pitcher that left spring training. He was missing his spots. Some of those pitches that were hit out of the park, the catcher was sitting on the outside corner and the balls are inside, but they might have been outside. He's got to keep working. He's not throwing as hard, either, for whatever reason."

Hill rebounded in his next three starts, going twenty-one innings and giving up only two earned runs. Hill matched his career-high with eleven strikeouts against the Braves on June 7, 2007. For the season he was 11–8 with a 3.92 ERA in 32 starts with 183 strikeouts.

Hill started game 3 of the 2007 National League Division Series against the Arizona Diamondbacks but Chris Young homered off his first pitch of the game and he only lasted three innings, allowing six hits and three runs as the Cubs were swept in the series.

2008 season
Hill reworked his delivery during spring training in 2008 after some initial issues with his command but retained his spot in the rotation as the season began. He struggled to start the season, making five starts, and was 1–0 with a 4.12 ERA, striking out 15 but also walking 18. In his final start, against the St. Louis Cardinals on May 2, he walked four of the first six batters he faced and was removed in the first inning. On May 3, he was optioned back to Triple-A Iowa in order to get his control figured out.

Hill continued to have control problems in the minors and was shut down with a stiff back on May 17.  He suffered from various muscle strains the rest of the season, making only 13 starts in the minors for Iowa, Daytona and the Arizona League Cubs, and was 4–7 with a 5.85 ERA and 44 walks. He played for the Tigres de Aragua of the Venezuelan Winter League after the season and was 1–2 with a 6.86 ERA in nine games (six starts), walking 23 while striking out 16.

Baltimore Orioles

On February 2, 2009, Hill was traded to the Baltimore Orioles for a player to be named later.

Hill suffered an elbow injury in spring training and began the season on the disabled list.  He did not make his Orioles debut until May 16, 2009 going  with six strikeouts and earning a victory. He started 13 games for Baltimore with a 3–3 record, a 7.80 ERA, and 46 strikeouts in  innings. On July 29, it was revealed that Hill had a torn labrum in his left shoulder, and had been pitching through it all season. He was placed on the disabled list for the rest of the season and underwent surgery to repair the labrum on August 8. Hill was outrighted off the 40 man roster on October 30 and elected free agency on November 3.

St. Louis Cardinals
On January 26, 2010, Hill signed a minor league contract with the St. Louis Cardinals with an invitation to spring training. General Manager John Mozeliak said that Hill had recovered from his surgery and was expected to compete for the fifth starter job. Hill struggled in spring training, which was frustrating for him; he was beaten out by Jaime García in the battle for the fifth starter spot.

Hill was assigned to the Triple-A Memphis Redbirds, where he had a 4–3 record in 23 games (46 IP) to go with a 4.30 ERA and 47 strikeouts. He only made four starts, and was instead used primarily out of the bullpen for the first time in his career. In June of that year, he opted out of his contract with St. Louis.

Boston Red Sox
On June 30, 2010, Hill signed a minor league contract with the Boston Red Sox. He was assigned to the Triple-A Pawtucket Red Sox. He appeared in 19 games for them, six of which were starts, and had a 3–1 record and 3.74 ERA. Hill was called up to the Red Sox major league roster on September 13 and made his debut with them as a reliever against the Seattle Mariners the following day, retiring the one batter he faced and recording the win. He appeared in six games the rest of the season, working four innings out of the bullpen, striking out three, walking one and allowing no runs to score. At the end of the season, he was outrighted to the minors and became a free agent on November 6.

The Red Sox re-signed Hill to a minor league contract with an invitation to spring training on December 16, 2010. Hill transitioned to a "sidewinder" pitcher during spring training and outperformed other relievers trying to make the roster, but was optioned back to Pawtucket to start the season. He appeared in 10 games in the minors, pitching 16 innings and had a 1.12 ERA with one save. His contract was then purchased by the Red Sox, and he was called up to the majors on May 5.

On May 29, Hill injured his left throwing elbow and on June 9, and underwent Tommy John surgery to repair a torn Ulnar collateral ligament. In nine games with the Red Sox in 2011, Hill pitched eight innings, striking out 12, walking three and giving up no earned runs. On December 12, Hill was non-tendered, and became a free agent.

On December 30, 2011, the Red Sox again re-signed Hill to a minor-league contract that included an invitation to spring training. His recovery progressed ahead of schedule and he made his first rehab appearance in the minors, with the Greenville Drive, on April 7, 2012. He made 16 minor league rehab appearances, across five different levels, and had a 2.20 ERA with 27 strikeouts and five walks. He rejoined the Red Sox roster on April 27. He experienced renewed soreness in his elbow on June 10 and was placed back on the disabled list. He was diagnosed with a strained flexor muscle and he didn't rejoin the roster until September 1. Overall, he appeared in 25 games for the Red Sox in 2012, with a 1.83 ERA in  innings and 21 strikeouts. He was non-tendered on November 30 and became a free agent.

Cleveland Indians
On February 7, 2013, Hill signed a minor league deal with an invite to big league spring training with the Cleveland Indians. Terry Francona, who had been Hill's manager during his time with the Red Sox, was now the manager in Cleveland, and was impressed with his stuff and his comeback from the injury. On March 11, the Indians purchased his contract and added him to the 40-man roster. He made the opening day roster as a relief pitcher.

Over the 2013 MLB season, he appeared in a career-high 63 games, working  innings and was 1–2 with a 6.28 ERA. He also struck out 51 batters while walking 29. His average inherited runners stranded rate was 11.88. He was among the leaders in inherited runners stranded with 51. He became a free agent at the conclusion of the season.

Boston Red Sox (second stint)

Hill signed a minor league deal to return to the Red Sox on February 9, 2014. The deal included an invitation to spring training. Hill reported late to camp after a family emergency, which caused him to fall behind the other relievers in camp. He did not make the opening day roster, and was instead assigned to Pawtucket, where he had a 3.23 ERA in 25 games.

Los Angeles Angels

Hill was traded to the Los Angeles Angels of Anaheim for cash considerations on July 1, 2014. He appeared in just two games for the Angels, both parts of a doubleheader that was played that day. In the first game, he allowed a single and walked two batters and in the second game, he walked the one batter he faced and threw a wild pitch. He was designated for assignment a few days later, without appearing in another game, and then released on July 11.

New York Yankees

On July 17, 2014, Hill signed a minor league deal with the New York Yankees and was assigned to the Triple A Scranton/Wilkes-Barre RailRiders. With the RailRiders, he appeared in four games and did not allow a run. The Yankees promoted him to the major leagues on August 5. He was designated for assignment on August 29, but was re-added to the roster on September 2. Overall, he appeared in 14 games, working a total of  innings with a 1.69 ERA.

Washington Nationals

On February 27, 2015, Hill signed a minor league deal with the Washington Nationals that included an invitation to spring training. Even though he was signed late after camp had started, manager Matt Williams said they intended to have him compete for a bullpen spot on the team. Despite pitching well in exhibition games, Hill did not make the opening day roster and was reassigned to the Triple-A Syracuse Chiefs on April 4. He expressed his disappointment with the decision. He appeared in 25 games for the Chiefs, working  innings for a 2–2 record and 2.91 ERA. He was released by the Nationals on June 24 after exercising the opt out clause in his contract.

Long Island Ducks

Hill was determined to return from the bullpen to the starting rotation. On July 28, 2015, after not receiving any other offers, Hill signed with the Long Island Ducks of the Atlantic League of Professional Baseball as a starting pitcher. He made two starts with the Ducks. On August 9, he struck out 14 batters in six innings against the Camden Riversharks, tying the franchise record. He pitched 11 innings for the Ducks over those two starts, with 21 strikeouts, only three walks and two hits and no runs allowed.

Boston Red Sox (third stint)
Hill signed a minor league deal with the Red Sox on August 14, 2015. He made five starts for Pawtucket and was 3–2 with a 2.78 ERA. Hill was brought up from Pawtucket on September 8 and made his first major league start since 2009 on September 13, giving up one hit over seven innings, while striking out 10 batters and walking one. On September 25, Hill pitched a complete game two-hitter while striking out 10 batters for the third consecutive start. In four starts for the Red Sox, he was 2–1 with a 1.55 ERA and 36 strikeouts.

Oakland Athletics
On November 17, 2015, Hill agreed to a one-year deal with the Oakland Athletics for $6 million. After spring training, Hill was named the fifth starter, but ended up starting on Opening Day after planned starter Sonny Gray was hospitalized with a case of food poisoning. With the Athletics, Hill had a 2.25 ERA and a record of 9–3 in 14 starts. Hill was named American League Pitcher of the Month for May 2016 after posting a 5–1 record with a 2.13 ERA and 37 strikeouts in six starts.

Los Angeles Dodgers
On August 1, 2016, the Athletics traded Hill and Josh Reddick to the Los Angeles Dodgers for Grant Holmes, Jharel Cotton, and Frankie Montas. He made his debut as a Dodger on August 24, pitching six scoreless innings and earning the win in a 1–0 game against the San Francisco Giants. On September 10 against the Miami Marlins, Hill pitched seven perfect innings before he was replaced by a relief pitcher. It was the first time in major league history that a manager had pulled a pitcher that late in the game with a perfect game in reach. In six starts for the Dodgers, he was 3–2 with a 1.83 ERA.

Hill started the second game of the 2016 National League Division Series against the Washington Nationals, pitching well for three innings before allowing a three-run home run to Jose Lobaton in the fourth inning of what became a 5–2 loss. He came back to pitch on short rest in the deciding game five, pitching  innings in a game the Dodgers eventually won 4–3. In game three of the 2016 National League Championship Series, Hill allowed only two hits in six innings in the Dodgers victory over the Chicago Cubs. However, the Cubs came back and beat the Dodgers in six games to win the series.

On December 5, 2016, the Dodgers re-signed Hill to a three-year, $48 million, contract. Hill came down with a blister on his left middle finger, an issue that had bothered him throughout the previous season.

2017 
Making his first start of the season against the San Diego Padres on April 5, 2017, Hill pitched five innings, but left the game with the lingering blister on his finger. Two days later, on April 7, Hill was placed on the 10-day disabled list. On April 17, Hill was again placed on the 10-day disabled list due to the same finger blister lingering, marking the second time in almost 11 days that Hill went on the disabled list. He returned to the rotation to earn National League Pitcher of the Month honors in July with a 4–0 record, 1.45 ERA and 40 strikeouts against only 5 walks in 5 starts.

On August 23, 2017, against the Pittsburgh Pirates, Hill was pitching a perfect game through eight innings until a fielding error by Logan Forsythe in the ninth. He remained in the game for the tenth inning but his no-hitter was ended by a walk-off home run by Josh Harrison, which was the first extra-innings walk-off home run to break up a no-hitter (and second walk-off hit, following Harvey Haddix in 1959). This was the first perfect game broken up by a ninth-inning error in MLB history, and Hill became the first pitcher since Lefty Leifield of the 1906 Pittsburgh Pirates to lose a decision despite throwing at least nine innings with one or fewer hits and no walks allowed. For the 2017 season, he was 12–8 with a 3.32 ERA in 25 starts. Hill pitched in one game in the 2017 NLDS, allowing two runs in four innings. In one start in the 2017 NLCS, he limited the Cubs to one run on three hits in five innings, while striking out eight. In two starts in the 2017 World Series, he allowed a total of two runs on seven hits in  innings with 12 strikeouts.

2018 
Through the first two months of the 2018 season, Hill landed twice on the disabled list due to recurring blister issues in his pitching hand. He was 11–5 with a 3.66 ERA in 25 appearances (24 starts).

Hill started in Game 4 of the 2018 World Series for the Dodgers, and pitched through six innings against the Boston Red Sox, having given up only one hit and thrown 91 pitches. He was then controversially pulled from the game by manager Dave Roberts after striking out Eduardo Núñez. The Red Sox scored nine runs after Hill's departure from the game in an eventual 9–6 loss by the Dodgers, who lost the series the next game.

2019
After beginning the season in the Dodgers rotation, Hill suffered a left forearm strain in a game on June 19 and was placed on the disabled list. He rejoined the team in September and finished the season 4–1 with a 2.45 ERA in 13 starts. He was awarded the Tony Conigliaro Award for having overcome his arm troubles.

Minnesota Twins
On December 31, 2019, Hill signed a one-year contract with the Minnesota Twins.

On July 29, 2020, Hill made his Twins debut. With the 2020 Minnesota Twins, Hill appeared in 8 games, compiling a 2–2 record with 3.03 ERA and 31 strikeouts in  innings pitched.

Tampa Bay Rays
On February 17, 2021, Hill signed a one-year, $2.5 million contract with the Tampa Bay Rays. Hill was named American League Pitcher of the Month for May. In 19 starts for the Rays, Hill registered a 6-4 record and 3.87 ERA with 91 strikeouts in  innings.

New York Mets
On July 23, 2021, Hill was traded to the New York Mets in exchange for Tommy Hunter and minor league catcher Matt Dyer.

Boston Red Sox (fourth stint)
On December 1, 2021, Hill signed a one-year contract to return to the Red Sox. He opened the season as part of Boston's rotation. In late April, Hill spent several days on the bereavement list following the death of his father. He was on the COVID-related injured list from May 6 to May 14. Hill was added to the injured list on July 2, due to a left knee strain, following a start at Wrigley Field. He returned to the team on August 1. In 26 starts with Boston during 2022, Hill posted an 8–7 record with 4.27 ERA while striking out 109 batters in  innings.

In early November 2022, Hill elected to become a free agent.

Pittsburgh Pirates
On January 5, 2023, Hill signed a one-year, $8 million contract with the Pittsburgh Pirates.

Nicknames 
During the inaugural MLB Players Weekend in 2017, Rich Hill wore the name "BRICE" on his jersey to honor his son. Hill wore the name "D. Mountain" on his jersey during the 2018 MLB Players Weekend. The name originated when Hill played for the Boston Red Sox in 2015. Teammate Brock Holt thought it would be funny to call him "Dick" for "Richard" and "Mountain" for "Hill", creating the moniker "Dick Mountain."

Personal life
Hill married Caitlin McClellan, a nurse, on November 11, 2007. The couple had two sons, Brice and Brooks. Brooks died in February 2014, aged two months, of lissencephaly and congenital nephrotic syndrome, which Hill wrote about in 2019.

Hill was arrested on December 21, 2019, for disorderly conduct and resisting arrest while attending a New England Patriots game at Gillette Stadium, after he allegedly tried to stop police from putting his wife under arrest. The couple had reportedly attempted to enter the stadium multiple times with an oversized bag, in violation of the NFL's stringent rules regarding such matters.  All criminal charges were later dropped; the couple paid a total of $1,000 in civil fines.

See also
 List of World Series starting pitchers

References

External links

1980 births
Living people
Arizona League Cubs players
Baltimore Orioles players
Baseball players from Massachusetts
Boise Hawks players
Boston Red Sox players
Chatham Anglers players
Chicago Cubs players
Cleveland Indians players
Daytona Cubs players
Frederick Keys players
Greenville Drive players
Gulf Coast Red Sox players
Iowa Cubs players
Lansing Lugnuts players
Long Island Ducks players
Los Angeles Angels players
Los Angeles Dodgers players
Major League Baseball pitchers
Memphis Redbirds players
Michigan Wolverines baseball players
Minnesota Twins players
New York Mets players
New York Yankees players
Norfolk Tides players
Oakland Athletics players
Pawtucket Red Sox players
People from Milton, Massachusetts
Peoria Chiefs players
Portland Sea Dogs players
Rancho Cucamonga Quakes players
Salem Red Sox players
Scranton/Wilkes-Barre RailRiders players
Syracuse Chiefs players
Tampa Bay Rays players
Tigres de Aragua players
American expatriate baseball players in Venezuela
West Tennessee Diamond Jaxx players
Sportspeople from Norfolk County, Massachusetts